Anna Gardie (c. 1760 – July 21, 1798) was a French-born American stage actress and dancer.

Career 
Anna Gardie was born c. 1760, in Santa Domingo, in Dominican Republic, then the French colony of Saint-Domingue. She started out performing there before immigrating to the United States. She made her American debut performing in Philadelphia at the Chestnut Street Theater in the pantomime La Foret Noire in 1794. She then danced in the ballet-pantomime Sophia of Brabant in 1795 with the United States first male professional dancer, John Durang. As the first ballet-pantomime, the performance was considered innovative.

Death 
On July 21, 1798, Anna Gardie and her husband, a French music copyist, were found dead with stab wounds at Fraunces Tavern, where she was living at the time. The coroner ruled it a murder-suicide committed by her husband.

References 

18th-century American actresses
People murdered in New York City
Female murder victims
1798 deaths
18th-century ballet dancers
1760 births